Suzanne Goodwin, née Suzanne Ebel (27 September 1916 – 28 February 2008), was a British writer of over 40 romantic novels and was translated into some 15 languages. Under her maiden name she wrote contemporary romances and British guides, under her married name historical romances, she also used the pseudonym of Cecily Shelbourne. In 1964, her novel Journey from Yesterday won the Romantic Novel of the Year Award awarded by the Romantic Novelists' Association. and in 1986 the British Travel Association Award.

Biography

Personal life
Born Suzanne Cecile Ebel on 27 September 1916 in Sutton, Surrey, London, England, UK, of an Irish mother and French father, an interior decorator who drove a Rolls-Royce. She was educated at Roman Catholic schools in England and Belgium. In London, she worked as journalist on the Woman's Page of The Times Newspaper, and from 1950 to 1972 as a director of the advertising agency Young and Rubicam.

She married Adrian Belsey, a dentist, with whom she had a son, James, and an adopted daughter, Marigold, but the marriage faltered. In 1947, she met John Goodwin, a former lieutenant in the RNVR and later theatre publicist and head of publications and publicity at the Royal Shakespeare Company and The National Theatre, he also edited Peter Hall's diaries and they had a son, Tim. They finally married in 1971, after she was widowed.

She died on 28 February 2008.

Career
She published Journey from Yesterday in 1963, which won the Romantic Novel of the Year Award by the Romantic Novelists' Association. She started writing contemporary romances under her maiden name Suzanne Ebel, and used her married name Suzanne Goodwin when writing historical romances.

Bibliography

As Suzanne Ebel

Contemporary novels
 Love the Magician (1956)
 Journey from Yesterday (1963)
 The Half-Enchanted (1964)
 The Dangerous Winter (1965)
 The Love Campaign (1965)
 A Perfect Stranger (1966)
 A Name in Lights (1968)
 A Most Auspicious Star (1969)
 Somersault (1971)
 Portrait of Jill (1972)
 Dear Kate (1972)
 To Seek a Star (1973)
 The Family Feeling (1973)
 Girl by the Sea (1974)
 Music in Winter (1975)
 Grove of Olives (1976)
 River Voices (1976)
 The Double Rainbow (1977)
 A Rose in the Heather (1978)
 The Provencal Summer (1980)
 Julia's Sister (1982)
 The House of Nightingales (1985)
 The Clover Field (1987)
 Reflections in a Lake (1988)

Guides
 Explore the Cotswolds by Bicycle (1973) (with Doreen Impey)
 London's Riverside (1975) (with Doreen Impey)

As Suzanne Goodwin

Single novels
 The Winter Spring (1978)
 Emerald (1980)
 The Winter Sisters (1980)
 Floodtide (1983)
 Sisters (1984)
 Cousins (1986)
 Daughters (1987)
 Lovers (1988)
 To Love a Hero (1989)
 A Change of Season (1991)
 The Rising Storm (1992)
 While the Music Lasts (1992)
 The Difference (1994)
 Sheer Chance (1997)
 A Rising Star (1997)
 Starstruck (1997)
 One Bright Star (1998)
 French Leave (2001)

Collaboration
 Godfrey: A Special Time Remembered (1983) (by Jill Bennet)

As Cecily Shelbourne

Single novel
 Stage of Love (1978)

References and sources

1916 births
2008 deaths
People from Surrey
English romantic fiction writers
RoNA Award winners
20th-century English novelists
21st-century British novelists
20th-century English women writers
21st-century English women writers
Women romantic fiction writers
English women novelists